Li Ching, also spelled Lee Ching (8 November 1948 – 22 February 2018), was a Hong Kong actress.

Early life
Li Ching was born in Shanghai as Li Guoying, and was raised in British Hong Kong after finishing secondary school and an acting course.

Career 
Li announced her retirement as an actress in 1983, after appearing in more than 60 films.

Personal life
Li was found dead in her home on 22 February 2018. Li was 69 years old.

Filmography

Films 
 1964 Between Tears and Smiles 
 1964 The Dancing Millionairess (Wan hua ying chun) as Chorus girl
 1964 The Last Woman of Shang (Da ji)
 1964  
 1964 The Crimson Palm (Xie shou yin)
 1964 The Female Prince as Chun Lan
 1965 Inside the Forbidden City as Ghost of Kou Zhu
 1965 The Mermaid as Chin Mu-tan/Pipo fairy
 1965 The Lotus Lamp (Bai lian deng) as Lingzhi
 1965 The West Chamber (Xi xiang ji) as Hongniang
 1966 Sweet and Wild (Ye gu niang) as Jin Xiao-fang
 1966  (Wen Suchen) as Sister Yu Chin-erh
 1967 Sweet is Revenge (Da xia fu chou ji)
 1967 Nu xun an as Huo Ting-chin
 1967 Jing jing as Ching-ching
 1967 The King with My Face as Princess Hui Hsi
 1967 Swan Song 
 1967 Susanna as Lin Shan-Shan
 1967 Rape of the Sword (Dao jian) as Zhong Jiao Long
 1967 Lady Jade Locket as Lien Suo/Lien Wei
 1968 Hong Kong Rhapsody as Chang Hsiao-Ping
 1968 The Sword of Swords as Pai Feng
 1969 Hao xia zhuan (Killers Five)
 1969 The Invincible Fist as Kuei Ku
 1969 Dead End as Wen You
 1969 The Three Smiles (San xiao) as Chiu Hsiang
 1969 Have Sword, Will Travel as Yun Piau Piau
 1970 Nu xiao chun se as Helen Li Hai-lun
 1970 A Place to Call Home (Yu nu qin qing)
 1970 E lang gu 
 1971 King Eagle as 7th Chief Yuk Lin/8th Chief An Bing Er
 1971 The New One-Armed Swordsman as Pa Hsiao
 1971  as Shen Ping Hung
 1971 The Long Chase as Wang Hsueh Niang
 1972 The Human Goddess 
 1972 Wa wa fu ren 
 1972 The 14 Amazons as Yang Pa Mei
 1972 Wang ming tu 
 1973 A Woman with Half Soul
 1973 Niu gui she shen 
 1973 Ambush (1973 film) as Fan Hsiu-hsiu
 1973 Sexy Girls of Denmark (Dan Ma jiao wa)
 1973 Dang nu ji hang 
 1974 Gui ma xiao tian shi 
 1974 Yan nu huan hun as Sung Lien-hua
 1974 Heung gong chat sup sam 
 1974 Sorrow of the Gentry as Sun Shu-cheng
 1975 That's Adultery 
 1975 Jin mao shi wang as Wen Fang
 1975 Shuang xing ban yue 
 1975 Xi xiao nu ma 
 1975 Evil Seducers (Guest star)
 1975 My Bewitched Wife as Fox Fairy Hu Hsiao-hsin
 1975 Qing suo 
 1975 Lover's Destiny
 1976 Tiger Cliff 
 1976 Wedding Nights as Chan Hsien-hsien
 1976 Hu tian hu di as Fox Fairy Hu Hsiao-hsin
 1976 Mr. Funnybone as Miss Chen
 1977 Clans of Intrigue as Black Pearl Hei Chen-chu
 1977 Heroes of the Eastern Skies 
 1978 Xin hong lou meng as Hsieh Bao-Chai
 1978 Zhui

References

External links
 
 Hong Kong Cinemagic entry

Hong Kong film actresses
1948 births
2018 deaths
Actresses from Shanghai
20th-century Chinese actresses
20th-century Hong Kong actresses
Chinese film actresses
Shaw Brothers Studio